The Windy Gap Trail is a short but important link of the north San Gabriel River valley to the Pacific Crest Trail in the San Gabriel Mountains in California. The trailhead starts at the uppermost parking lot of the Crystal Lake Recreation Area, which is about 3 miles (4.8 km) up from State Route 39, 25 miles (40 km) above Azusa, California. The trail is rated moderately strenuous.

In September 2002, parts of the trail were burned in the Curve Fire, which burned  and included parts of the Crystal Lake Recreation Area. Nearly the entire length of the trail is exposed to direct sunlight due to the fire. However, new growth has been observed during the trail restoration effort in the aftermath of the Curve Fire.

The trail heads due north up the steep canyon face above the campground and crosses the South Hawkins fire lookout access road twice. The second crossing is near the Big Cienega Spring after which it heads on a right oblique toward the ridge and the saddle, which is named Windy Gap. From this vantage point one faces into a seemingly perpetual wind that blows up from the broad canyon below.

External links 
 
 Dan’s Hiking Page/Windy Gap Trail
 After-fire trail restoration
 Current repairs being performed on the trail
 Windy Gap Trail on Facebook (checked 25/Oct/2015)

Angeles National Forest
Hiking trails in California
Protected areas of Los Angeles County, California
San Gabriel Mountains